Scopula viettei is a moth of the family Geometridae. It is found on Madagascar.

References

Moths described in 1992
viettei
Moths of Madagascar